is a city located in Akita Prefecture, Japan. , the city had an estimated population of 30.715, and a population density of 43 persons per km² in 12.970 households.

Geography
Kazuno is located in a valley in the mountains of far northeastern Akita Prefecture, with the Ōu Mountains and Iwate Prefecture on the east. Much of the city is within the borders of the Towada-Hachimantai National Park. Much of the city area is covered in forest. Due to its inland location, the city is noted for its heavy snowfall in winter. It is also known for the wild deer.

Neighboring municipalities
 Akita Prefecture
 Kitaakita
 Ōdate
 Semboku
 Kosaka
 Iwate Prefecture
 Hachimantai
 Aomori Prefecture
 Towada
 Takko
 Sannohe
 Shingō

Climate
Kazuno has a humid continental climate (Köppen climate classification Dfa) with large seasonal temperature differences, with warm to hot (and often humid) summers and cold (sometimes severely cold) winters with heavy snowfalls.

History
The area of present-day Kazuno was settled in prehistoric times, and contains major Jōmon period archaeological sites and numerous burial mounds from the Kofun period. The area was part of ancient Mutsu Province and was ruled by the Nambu clan of Morioka Domain during the  Edo period. After the start of the Meiji period, the area became briefly part of Rikuchū Province before being transferred to Akita Prefecture in 1871. It was organized as part of Kazuno District, Akita Prefecture in 1878 with the establishment of the modern municipalities system.

The city of Kazuno was founded on April 1, 1972 by the merger of the towns of Hanawa, Towada, and Osarizawa and the village of Hachimantai.

Demographics
Per Japanese census data, the population of Kazuno has declined over the past 60 years.

Government

Kazuno has a mayor-council form of government with a directly elected mayor and a unicameral city legislature of 18 members. The city contributes two members to the Akita Prefectural Assembly.  In terms of national politics, the city is part of Akita District 2 of the lower house of the Diet of Japan.

Economy
The economy of Kazuno is based on agriculture, forestry and seasonal tourism.

Education
Kazuno has nine public elementary schools and five public middle schools operated by the city government and two public high schools operated by the Akita Prefectural Board of Education. Akita Prefecture also operates one special education school for the handicapped.

Transportation

Railway
 East Japan Railway Company - Hanawa Line
  -  -  -  -  -  -  -

Highway

Local attractions

 Chagama Falls – one of the Japan's Top 100 Waterfalls
 Ōyu Stone Circles - Jōmon period archaeological site, Special National Historic Site of Japan
 former Osarizawa Mine
 Hachimantai Onsen
 Ōyu Onsen
 Yuza Onsen
 Dainichido Bugaku - Ritual dance and music held on January 2, UNESCO Intangible cultural heritage
 Alpas Sports Park

International relations

Kazuno is twinned with:
  Sopron, Hungary  (1995)
  Liangzhou, China  since November 6, 2000

Noted people from Kazuno
 Junko Asari, Olympic marathon runner
 Kenichi Takahashi, Olympic long-distance runner
 Takayuki Matsumiya, Olympic long-distance runner
 Yasuhiko Okudera, professional soccer player
 Yuta Kimura, professional baseball player
 Naitō Torajirō, historian
 Tomoefuji Toshihide, sumo wrestler

Media
 Kazuno Kiritanpo FM

References

External links

 Official Website 

 
Cities in Akita Prefecture